Castle Stuart is a restored tower house on the banks of the Moray Firth, about  northeast of Inverness.

The land the castle was built on was granted to James Stewart, 1st Earl of Moray by his half-sister, Mary, Queen of Scots, following her return to Scotland in 1561. The successive murders of Stewart and his son-in-law, James Stewart, 2nd Earl of Moray, meant that the castle was finally completed by his grandson, James Stuart, 3rd Earl of Moray, in 1625.

Though the castle initially flourished, it fell into disuse as the fortunes of the House of Stuart sank during the English Civil War and Charles I was executed. The castle lay derelict for 300 years before being restored; it is currently used as a luxury hotel.

Golf links
The seaside links golf course at Castle Stuart along Moray Firth opened  in 2009, co-designed by two Americans: managing partner Mark Parsinen and golf course architect Gil Hanse. It was voted as Best New Course for 2009 by Golf magazine.

The course hosted the Scottish Open in 2011, 2012, 2013, and 2016.

Scorecard

Source:

References

External links

Castle Stuart Golf Links
Highland Golf Links – Castle Stuart
European Tour – Scottish Open

Castles in Highland (council area)
Houses in Highland (council area)
Category A listed buildings in Highland (council area)
Listed castles in Scotland
Clan Stewart